Adam Wielomski (born 1972) is a professor at the University of Natural Sciences and Humanities in Siedlce, where he teaches in the Institute of Social Sciences and Security of the Faculty of Humanities. Wielomski is the author and co-author of several books on Spanish and French counter-revolutionary political thought. He is also the editor-in-chief of quarterly journal Pro Fide Rege et Lege and a columnist for Najwyższy Czas!.

He is a leader of Klub Zachowawczo-Monarchistyczny (KZM, Conservative Monarchist Club) a right wing lobby, and was a former contributor to the Łodzian Ruch Narodowy (ŁRN) (Łódzki Ruch Narodowy) „Szczerbiec”.

Wielomski identifies as a Traditionalist Catholic and conservative, but objects to the rising affiliation of Traditionalist Catholicism with the "Völkisch movement" in Poland.

Bibliography

English 

 The Europe of Nations and Its Future: Nationalism, Euroscepticism, Natiocratism (co-authored with Magdalena Ziętek-Wielomska), Towarzystwo Naukowe Myśli Politycznej i Prawnej, Warszawa 2017,

Polish 

 Od grzechu do apokatastasis. Historiozofia Josepha de Maistre, Instytut Liberalno-Konserwatywny, Lublin 1999, 
 Filozofia polityczna francuskiego tradycjonalizmu 1796-1830, Wydawnictwo Arcana, Kraków 2003, 
 Hiszpania Franco: źródła i istota doktryny politycznej, Wydawnictwo ARTE, Biała Podlaska 2006, 
 Dekalog konserwatysty, Wydawnictwo Megas, Warszawa 2006, 
 Encyklopedia polityczna, tom 1 (co-authored with Jacek Bartyzel i Bogdan Szlachta), Polskie Wydawnictwo Encyklopedyczne, Radom 2007, 
 Kontrrewolucja, której nie było, Wydawnictwo Megas, Warszawa 2007, 
 Konserwatyzm: główne idee, nurty i postacie, Fijorr Publishing, Warszawa 2007, 
 Nacjonalizm francuski 1886-1940: geneza, przemiany i istota filozofii politycznej, Von Borowiecky, Warszawa 2007, 
 Lech Kaczyński w Tbilisi (co-authored with Jan Engelgard), Wydawnictwo Prasy Lokalnej, Warszawa 2008, 
 Prawa człowieka i ich krytyka: przyczynek do studiów o ideologii czasów ponowożytnych (co-authored with Paweł Bała), Fijorr Publishing, Warszawa 2008, 
 Carl Schmitt a Konstytucja Rzeczypospolitej Polskiej: studium przypadku ratyfikacji Traktatu lizbońskiego - rola Prezydenta RP (co-authored with Paweł Bała), Klub Zachowawczo-Monarchistyczny, Warszawa 2008, 
 Kościół w cieniu gilotyny: Katolicyzm francuski wobec rewolucji, Von Borowiecky, Warszawa 2009
 Krytyce demokracji (co-authored with Cezary Kalita), Wydawnictwo ARTE, Warszawa 2009, 
 Konserwatyzm – między Atenami a Jerozolimą. Szkice post-awerroistyczne, Fijorr Publishing, Warszawa 2009, 
 Wstęp do nauki o państwie, prawie i polityce (co-authored with Paweł Bała), Wydawnictwo ARTE, Warszawa 2010, 
 Faszyzmy łacińskie. Sen o rewolucji innej niż w Rosji i w Niemczech, Wydawnictwo ARTE, Warszawa 2011, 
 Teokracja papieska 1073-1378. Myśl polityczna papieży, papalistów i ich przeciwników, Von Borowiecky, Warszawa 2011, 
 Antologia Zbrodni Smoleńskiej (co-authored with Jan Engelgard i Maciej Motas), Wydawnictwo ARTE, Warszawa 2011, 
 Prawica w XX wieku, tom I, Von Borowiecky, Warszawa 2013, 
 System Polityczny, prawo i konstytucja Królestwa Polskiego 1815-1830 (co-authored with Lech Mażewski i Jacek Bartyzel), Von Borowiecky, Warszawa 2013, 
 Stepan Bandera w Kijowie. Kulisy rewolucji na Ukrainie (co-authored with Jan Engelgard i Arkadiusz Meller), Oficyna Wydawnicza Capital, Warszawa 2014, 
 Od Christianitas do Unii Europejskiej. Historia idei zjednoczenia Europy (co-authored with Łukasz Święcicki), Towarzystwo Naukowe Myśli Politycznej i Prawnej, Warszawa 2015, 
 Niemiecka myśl polityczna wobec narodowego socjalizmu (co-authored with Łukasz Święcicki i Jaromir Ćwikła), Klub Zachowawczo-Monarchistyczny, Warszawa 2016, 
 W poszukiwaniu Katechona. Teologia polityczna Carla Schmitta, Von Borowiecky, Warszawa 2016
 Prawica w XX wieku, tom 2, Von Borowiecky, Radzymin 2017, 
 Nowoczesność, nacjonalizm, naród europejski: dylematy samoidentyfikacji Europejczyków (co-authored with Magdalena Ziętek-Wielomska), Towarzystwo Naukowe Myśli Politycznej i Prawnej, Warszawa 2017, 
 Chrześcijaństwo i Europa wobec sekularyzacji. Religia w niemieckiej myśli politycznej XX wieku (co-authored with Łukasz Święcicki), Towarzystwo Naukowe Myśli Politycznej i Prawnej, Warszawa 2018, 
 Nacjonalizm wobec problemu Europy, Klub Zachowawczo-Monarchistyczny, Warszawa 2018, 
 Katolik – Prusak – nazista. Sekularyzacja w biografii politycznej Carla Schmitta, Von Borowiecky, Warszawa 2019, 
 Państwo narodowe i jego wrogowie (co-authored with Magdalena Ziętek-Wielomska), Fundacja Pro Vita Bona, Warszawa 2020

References

External links 

 Youtube channel
 Facebook page
 Pro vita bona

1972 births
Living people
Polish political scientists
Polish traditionalist Catholics
Polish conservatives
21st-century Polish philosophers